Satyrus or Satyros may refer to:

People
 Satyrus, a 5th-century BC Greek political figure, instrumental in the downfall of Cleophon
 Satyros I, also known as Satyrus, a ruler of Cimmerian Bosporus from 432 to 389 BC
 Satyros, a 4th-century BC architect who co-designed the Mausoleum of Mausolus
 Satyrus, a 4th-century BC actor who conversed with Demosthenes
 Satyrus, a 4th-century BC ruler of Heraclea, brother of Clearchus and uncle of Timotheus
 Satyrus the Peripatetic, a 3rd-century BC Greek philosopher and historian
 Satyrus of Milan, a 4th-century AD saint
 Satyrus of Arezzo, a 4th-century AD saint

Other uses
 Satyrus (ape), a species of ape described in some medieval bestiaries
 Satyrus (butterfly), a genus of butterflies
 Satyrus, one of three Short Kent aircraft that were built

See also
 Satyr
 Simia satyrus, the original scientific classification of the orangutan